Shamsul Haq is a Bangladesh Awami League politician and the former Minister of Local Government, Rural Development and Co-operatives from April 1972 to March 1973.

References

Awami League politicians
Local Government, Rural Development and Co-operatives ministers
1927 births
1998 deaths